The  is a museum of contemporary art  located in Kanazawa, Ishikawa,  Japan. 
The museum was designed by Japanese architects Kazuyo Sejima and Ryue Nishizawa of the architectural office SANAA in 2004. In October 2005, one year after its opening, the Museum marked 1,570,000 visitors. In 2020, due to the COVID-19 pandemic it attracted only 971,256 visitors, a drop of 63 percent from 2019, but it still ranked tenth on the list of most-visited art museums in the world.

The building

The Museum is located in the center of Kanazawa, near Kenroku-en garden and the Ishikawa Prefectural Museum of Art. The building has a circular form, with a diameter of 112.5 metres. This shape aims to keep the appearance of the overall building volume low, to mitigate the scale of the project and allows access from multiple points of entry. The transparency of the building further manifests the wish to avoid the museum being perceived as a large, introverted mass.

The building includes community gathering spaces, such as a library, lecture hall, and children’s workshop, located on the periphery, and museum spaces in the middle. The exhibition areas comprise numerous galleries with multiple options for division, expansion, or concentration. The galleries are of various proportions and light conditions – from bright daylight through glass ceilings to spaces with no natural light source, their height ranging from 4 to 12 metres. The circulation spaces are designed to make them usable as additional exhibition areas. Four fully glazed internal courtyards, each unique in character, provide ample daylight to the center of the building and a fluent border between community spaces and museum spaces.

Collection

The collection of the 21st Century Museum of Contemporary Art, Kanazawa is focused on works produced since 1980 that "propose new values".

Artists in the collection are encouraged to produce site-specific installations that become "closely associated with the Kanazawa area".

Artists in the permanent collection include; Francis Alys, Matthew Barney, Tony Cragg, Olafur Eliasson, Leandro Erlich, Isa Genzken, Kojima Hisaya, Gordon Matta Clark, Peter Newman, Carsten Nicolai, Giuseppe Penone, Gerhard Richter, Murayama Ruriko, Hiraki Sawa, Atsuko Tanaka, James Turrell, Patrick Tuttofuoco, Anne Wilson and Suda Yoshihiro.

Among the large scale works on permanent display are Leandro Ehrlich's Swimming Pool and Color Activity House by Olaflur Eliasson.

References

External links

 Aerial view on Wikimapia

Contemporary art galleries in Japan
Modernist architecture in Japan
Buildings and structures in Kanazawa, Ishikawa
Museums in Ishikawa Prefecture
Art museums and galleries in Japan
2004 establishments in Japan
Art museums established in 2004
SANAA buildings